Rome Done Lightly is George Adamson's 1972 "light-hearted romp" in words and drawings through the Eternal City.

Summary
"Tongue in cheek, [Adamson] sets the reader on a trail of research — does the Church of San Demente really exist? Why was the Bridge of Four Heads so named?" His text is full of curious and useful information, and some of the drawings were first published in Punch in two cartoon features on Rome.

Critical reception
The Economist praised the artist's skill as a cartoonist: "Familiarity breeds caricature: it is difficult to cartoon the unfamiliar. Mr Adamson has managed beautifully, with the minimum of tedious explanation and the maximum of careful drawing . . ." Cecil Roberts writing in Books and Bookmen touched upon a paradox underlying much of Adamson's work: "I wish [Rome] wasn't done so lightly. I am distressed to see so superb an artist put on cap and bells when illustrating the Roman scene."

Notes

External links
 Author's official website

1972 books
Chatto & Windus books
Books about Rome
British travel books
English non-fiction books